The UP Trango is a German single-place paraglider, designed and produced by UP Europe of Kochel am See, now UP International of Garmisch-Partenkirchen. Introduced in 2002, production continued through 2016 with the Trango XC3 model.

Design and development
The Trango was designed as an advanced performance cross country and competition glider.

The design has progressed through several generations of models, the Trango, Trango Race, Trango 2, Trango 3, Trango XC, Trango Xlight, Trango XC2, Trango X Light 2 and Trango XC3. The models are each named for their relative size.

The original model Trango's sail was made from Porsher Marine New Skytex and its lines were fabricated from Cousin Freres Technora Aramid.

The Trango XC3's sail top surface is made from Porcher Skytex 38 Universal and Porcher Skytex 27 Classic, while the bottom surface is also Porcher Skytex 27 Classic. The wing's cell walls are Porcher Skytex 32 Hard, Skytex 27 Hard. The gallery lines are made from Edelrid 8000U-090/070/050 (Aramid unsheathed), the middle lines are made from Edelrid 8000U-130/070 (Aramid unsheathed), the main lines are Liros DC200 (Dyneema unsheathed) and Edelrid 8000U-230/130 (Aramid unsheathed), while the brake lines are Cousin 989-1,5 (Dyneema sheathed) and Edelrid 8000U-090/070/050 (Aramid unsheathed).

Variants

Trango
Produced from 2002-2004.
Trango XS
Extra small-sized model for light pilots. The glider model is Deutscher Hängegleiterverband e.V. (DHV) 2-3 certified.
Trango S
Small-sized model for lighter pilots. The glider model is DHV 2-3 certified.
Trango M
Mid-sized model for medium-weight pilots. The glider model is DHV 2-3 certified.
Trango L
Large-sized model for heavier pilots. The glider model is DHV 2-3 certified.

Trango Race
Produced from 2002-2004.

Trango 2
Produced from 2005-2006.
Trango 2 XS
Extra small-sized model for lighter pilots. The glider model is not certified.
Trango 2 S
Small-sized model for lighter pilots. The glider model is DHV 2-3 certified.
Trango 2 SM
Small medium-sized model for medium-weight pilots. The glider model is DHV 2-3 certified.
Trango 2 M
Mid-sized model for medium-weight pilots. The glider model is DHV 2-3 certified.
Trango 2 L
Large-sized model for heavier pilots. The glider model is DHV 2-3 certified.
Trango 2 XL
Extra large-sized model for much heavier pilots. The glider model is not certified.

Trango 3
Produced from 2007-2009.
Trango 3 XS
Extra small-sized model for lighter pilots. The glider model is not certified.
Trango 3 S
Small-sized model for lighter pilots. The glider model is DHV 2-3 certified.
Trango 3 SM
Small medium-sized model for mid-weight pilots. The glider model is DHV 2-3 certified.
Trango 3 M
Mid-sized model for medium-weight pilots. The glider model is DHV 2-3 certified.
Trango 3 L
Large-sized model for heavier pilots. The glider model is DHV 2-3 certified.
Trango 3 XL
Extra large-sized model for much heavier pilots. The glider model is not certified.

Trango XC
Produced from 2010-2011.
Trango XC S
Small-sized model for lighter pilots. The glider model is DHV LTF/EN D certified.
Trango XC SM
Small medium-sized model for mid-weight pilots. The glider model is DHV LTF/EN D certified.
Trango XC M
Mid-sized model for medium-weight pilots. The glider model is DHV LTF/EN D certified.
Trango XC L
Large-sized model for heavier pilots. The glider model is DHV LTF/EN D certified.

Trango Xlight
Produced from 2009-2011. Designed specifically for the 2009 Red Bull X-Alps competition as a high performance lightweight wing.
Trango Xlight S
Small-sized model for lighter pilots. The glider model is not certified.
Trango Xlight SM
Small medium-sized model for mid-weight pilots. The glider model is not certified.
Trango Xlight M
Mid-sized model for medium-weight pilots. The glider model is not certified.
Trango Xlight L
Large-sized model for heavier pilots. The glider model is not certified.

Trango XC2
Produced from 2012-2015.
Trango XC2 S
Small-sized model for lighter pilots. The glider model is DHV LTF/EN C certified.
Trango XC2 SM
Small medium-sized model for mid-weight pilots. The glider model is DHV LTF/EN C certified.
Trango XC2 M
Mid-sized model for medium-weight pilots. The glider model is DHV LTF/EN C certified.
Trango XC2 L
Large-sized model for heavier pilots. The glider model is DHV LTF/EN C certified.

Trango X-Light 2
Produced from 2013-2016. Designed specifically for the 2013 Red Bull X-Alps competition as a high performance lightweight wing. Starting in 2013 all X-Alps wings were required to be certified.
Trango X-Light 2 S
Small-sized model for lighter pilots. The glider model is DHV LTF/EN C certified.
Trango X-Light 2 SM
Small medium-sized model for mid-weight pilots. The glider model is DHV LTF/EN D certified.
Trango X-Light 2 M
Mid-sized model for medium-weight pilots. The glider model is DHV LTF/EN D certified.

Trango XC3
Produced from 2015-2016.
Trango XC3 S
Small-sized model for lighter pilots. The glider model is DHV LTF/EN D certified.
Trango XC3 S/M
Small medium-sized model for mid-weight pilots. The glider model is DHV LTF/EN C certified.
Trango XC3 M
Mid-sized model for medium-weight pilots. The glider model is DHV LTF/EN C certified.
Trango XC3 L
Large-sized model for heavier pilots. The glider model is DHV LTF/EN C certified.

Trango X-Race
Produced from 2016–present.
Trango X-Race S
Small-sized model for lighter pilots. The glider model is DHV LTF/EN D certified.
Trango X-Race S/M
Small medium-sized model for mid-weight pilots. The glider model is DHV LTF/EN C certified.
Trango X-Race M
Mid-sized model for medium-weight pilots. The glider model is DHV LTF/EN C certified.
Trango X-Race L
Large-sized model for heavier pilots. The glider model is DHV LTF/EN C certified.

Specifications (Trango X-Light 2 M)

References

External links

Trango
Paragliders